Mundelstrup is a village in east Jutland, Denmark, with a population of 412 (1 January 2022). It's located approximately 13 kilometres (8.1 mi) from central Aarhus.

References

External links 
 

Towns and settlements in Aarhus Municipality
Cities and towns in Aarhus Municipality